Marlhy Murphy (born June 29, 2002), is an American musician, actress, television personality and internet personality. For her solo music, she goes by the mononym Marlhy. She has worked with bands such as The Regrettes, Pretty Little Demons, Zeppos, We're Not Dudes, and Purple Hats and Jetpacks. She is the youngest performer to ever perform at South by Southwest, and has appeared in Kids React, Nickelodeon's React to That, Amazon's A History of Radness, 2010's The Key, 2014's The Social Worker, 2011's The Great Clubhouse Rescue, 2017’s Flunky's Upset, and 2018’s Overnights.

Biography
Murphy was born in Dallas, Texas. Around 2009, she began to play drums and started taking classes at School of Rock. Murphy also started playing piano when she was in the second grade. When Murphy was ten, she became the youngest performer at the South by Southwest (SXSW) festival. Murphy's band, the Zeppos, is a Led Zeppelin tribute band. The young members of We're Not Dudes and Pretty Little Demons, she met at the School of Rock in Dallas.

Discography

Solo
EPs
Ghost (2021)
Aftermath (2017)

Singles
State of Mind' with Duke & Jones (2022)
Phases (2022)
Teardrop' with NGTMRE (2022)
Ruined It (2022)
Cinema' with Odd Kid Out (2022)
Scared to Die (2022)
Cruise Control (2022)
Asking For A Friend' with Hook & Sling (2022)
Back To My Love' with Tritonal Falden Remix (2022)
Back To My Love' with Tritonal Far Out Remix (2022)
Back To My Love' with Tritonal (2022)
Nothing More To Say' with Ma Styler (2022)
Happy Yet (2022)
Would U' with Dirty Audio (2022)
Heartbreak Weekend' (2022)
Bittersweet' with Odd Kid Out (2022)
Ghost (2021)
Strangers (2021)
Fine (2021)
Uncomfortable (2021)
Like I Do (2021)
Like I Do Acoustic (2021)
Loners (2021)
Precious (2021)
Villain (2021)
I Know You Still Feel Something (2021)
Blaming Myself' with Athelo (2021)
Think of You' with Zookeper Morgan Page Remix (2021)
Used 2 You' with Odd Kid Out (2021)
Think of You' with Zookeper (2021)
Good Die Young (2021)
Betcha (2020)
Every Time' with MC4D (2020)
R.I.P. (2020)
Feelings' with Pluko (2020)
I See Through You (2020)
Want Too (2020)
See You Soon (2020)
Lowkey (2020)
Green Light (Arrows Remix) (2020)
I'd Rather Be Dumb (2020)
Drive Away Acoustic (2020)
Drive Away (2019)
Make 'Em Hurt (2019)
Ain't On Me' with Carneyval (2019)
C'est La Vie (2019)
Bubbles (2019)
Green Light (2019)
Claustrophobic (2019)
Fool ft. Sondai (2018)
Nothing Like It (2018)
Refuse (2018)
Real One ft. Jonah Narcissistic (2017)
Love (2017)
Story (2015)
Over and Over (2015)

Features
Punk Trap with Jayem (2019)

With Pretty Little Demons
Albums
Unknown Species (2014)

EPs
Flowers (2013)

With Zeppos
Zeppos I (2014)

With The Regrettes
EPs
Hey! (2015)

Singles
Hey Now (2015)

Composition credits
Feel Your Feelings Fool! (2017)
Attention Seeker (2018)

Filmography

Film

Television

Web

References

2002 births
Living people
21st-century American drummers
21st-century American women musicians
American women drummers
American television personalities
American women television personalities
American web series actresses
21st-century American actresses
YouTubers from Texas
The Regrettes members
Pretty Little Demons members